Coded Illusions was a computer game development company based in the Netherlands, founded in August 2005 after being a two-year hobby project. The company was abolished in September 2008.

Products

Though the company hasn't made official announcements yet, it is known that the company is currently working on a third-person action/adventure game for next-gen video game consoles.

The company's website currently lists a project called Nomos but the link leads back to the front page. The company's profile on Gamasutra names the game Haven, but this profile is older than the project page on the Coded Illusions website.

While no further details have been released by Coded Illusions, it appears playtesting for the game has begun early 2008.

Abolition

In September 2008, it was announced that Coded Illusions was closing and their employees would be laid off.

Continuing development
After the closure of Coded Illusions in October 2008, some of its former employees founded a new studio : Vertigo Games based in Rotterdam, the Netherlands.
Comments have been made by Vertigo Games about the possibility of the Nomos project being picked up again in the future.

References

Video game development companies
Defunct video game companies of the Netherlands